The canton of Pays de la Force is an administrative division of the Dordogne department, southwestern France. It was created at the French canton reorganisation which came into effect in March 2015. Its seat is in Prigonrieux.

It consists of the following communes:

Bosset
Le Fleix
La Force
Fraisse
Gardonne
Ginestet
Lamonzie-Saint-Martin
Lunas
Monfaucon
Prigonrieux
Saint-Georges-Blancaneix
Saint-Géry
Saint-Laurent-des-Vignes
Saint-Pierre-d'Eyraud

References

Cantons of Dordogne